Galatyn Park station is a DART Light Rail station in Richardson, Texas. It is located at US 75 (Central Expressway) near Lookout Drive. This was a temporary northern terminus of the Red Line until December 2002 when the extension to Plano opened.

External links
 DART - Galatyn Park Station

Dallas Area Rapid Transit light rail stations
Richardson, Texas
Railway stations in the United States opened in 2002
2002 establishments in Texas
Railway stations in Dallas County, Texas